The Flames of Johannis is a lost 1916 silent film drama directed by Edgar Lewis and starring Nance O'Neil. It was written by O'Neil's husband Alfred Hickman and produced by the Lubin Manufacturing Company.

Cast
Nance O'Neil - Zirah/Marika
George Clarke - Mr. Vogel
Eleanor Barry - Mrs. Vogel
Ethel Tully - Gertrude
Victor Sutherland - George
Irving Dillon - Pastor Hoffner
Mary Carr - Kate (*as Mrs. Carr)
James Cassady - Paul
Violet Axzell - Little George
Rosemary Carr - Little Marika

References

External links
 The Flames of Johannis at IMDb.com

1916 films
American silent feature films
Films based on works by Hermann Sudermann
Lost American films
Lubin Manufacturing Company films
American black-and-white films
Silent American drama films
1916 drama films
Films directed by Edgar Lewis
1916 lost films
Lost drama films
1910s American films